Ái Nghĩa is a township and capital of Đại Lộc District, Quảng Nam Province, Vietnam.

References

Populated places in Quảng Nam province
District capitals in Vietnam
Townships in Vietnam